Bideshak or Bidashk or Bideshk or Bide Shak may refer to:
 Bideshk, Ardestan, Isfahan Province
 Bideshk, Shahin Shahr and Meymeh, Isfahan Province
 Bideshak, Khabar, Baft County, Kerman Province
 Bideshk, Kiskan, Baft County, Kerman Province
 Bideshk, Jiroft, Kerman Province